Damasus can refer to:

 Pope Damasus I (330–384) or St. Damasus
 Pope Damasus II (died 1048)
 Damasus Scombrus, Greek orator from Tralles
 Damasus (beetle), a genus of leaf beetle in the subfamily Eumolpinae
 Damasus (canonist) (12th–13th centuries); see Bartholomew of Brescia
 Damasus (mythology), a soldier on the Trojan side in the Trojan War

See also
 Damascus